Telephone area codes 602, 480, and 623 in the North American Numbering Plan (NANP) cover most of the Phoenix metropolitan area in the U.S. state of Arizona, including the city of Phoenix and the vast majority of its suburbs.

Area code 602 is the oldest of the three and was assigned in 1947 as the only area code for the entire state of Arizona. Under pressure from a population boom and new telecommunications services, it was split twice in five years in the 1990s. The first split in 1995 cleaved off numbers outside of metropolitan Phoenix to form area code 520 (since split itself to form 928); the second split, in 1999, carved out area codes 623 in the West Valley and 480 in the East Valley, with most of the city of Phoenix itself remaining in 602. The 1999 split had originally been proposed and approved as an overlay of a second area code, but the Arizona Corporation Commission nearly immediately reconsidered, leading to the adopted split. Metro Phoenix was consolidated into one rate center, so calls between the three area codes were generally local calls.

By the early 2020s, 480 and 602 were facing exhaustion within the decade, but 623 continued to have hundreds of unassigned central office codes. As a result, in 2021, the Corporation Commission approved a plan to convert the 1999 split into a three-code overlay complex beginning in 2023 instead of assigning two new overlay codes in the 480 and 602 areas within three years. This resulted in a transition to mandatory ten-digit dialing in the previous 602 and 623 areas; it was already required in 480.

History

Early history and split of 520
When the American Telephone and Telegraph Company (AT&T) created the first nationwide telephone numbering plan in 1947, Arizona was designated as a single numbering plan area and received a single area code, 602, of the original 86 area codes for routing telephone toll calls between states.

By the late 1980s, Arizona's population growth in the second half of the 20th century suggested the need of a second area code. Mountain Bell, the incumbent local exchange carrier in the state, requested a second area code for Arizona in 1988. BellCore, which at the time administered the assignment of area codes, denied the request and instead placed Arizona into the first phase of interchangeable dialing, in which central office codes with a middle digit of 0 or 1 were made available for use. This meant that in-state toll and collect calls would require dialing the area code.

In 1995, Arizona was allocated a second area code, area code 520, for all of the state outside the Phoenix metropolitan area. 520 was introduced on March 19, 1995. Permissive dialing of 602 continued across Arizona until October 22, 1995. On that date, use of 520 became mandatory for rural Arizona. The new area code became mandatory in Flagstaff, Prescott, and Yuma on June 30, 1996, and in Tucson on December 31, 1996. The freed central office codes in 602 were then used for new telephone numbers in the Phoenix area.

Overlay or split?
The creation of 520 was originally intended as a long-term solution; under original projections, Arizona was not expected to need another area code until at least 2015. However, Arizona's explosive population growth in the 1990s, the introduction of new competitive telephone service providers and telecommunications technologies (such as cell phones, pagers, and dial-up Internet), and an inefficient number allocation system brought 602 to the brink of exhaustion far sooner than expected. It soon became apparent that metropolitan Phoenix, now one of the largest toll-free calling zones in the nation, needed at least one additional area code. By 1997, two ideas were on the table for how to introduce a second area code into metropolitan Phoenix, and the telephone industry could not reach a consensus on which was more suitable. US West, formerly Mountain Bell, was in favor of an overlay. In an overlay, a second area code would be added to the existing 602 area. This would have required the implementation of ten-digit dialing for all local calls. The other option was a split, in which the suburban portion of the Valley would have received another area code, with 602 retained by areas primarily in the city of Phoenix. Conversely, newer entrants to the telephone market, like MCI Communications, supported a split because US West, as the dominant provider in the region, held most of the numbers in 602.

The final word rested with the Arizona Corporation Commission (ACC), which regulates public utilities. In November 1998, on a 2–1 vote, the ACC voted to adopt the overlay for implementation in 1999. Corporation Commission staff felt the overlay offered a more long-term solution than a split, which was projected to require additional relief within four years for metro Phoenix and 12 years for suburban areas. In early December, 480 was assigned as the second area code.

The adoption of the overlay plan, however, met with criticism from the public. Overlays were still a new concept at the time and met with some resistance due to the need for ten-digit dialing. Just two weeks after voting in favor, the ACC opted to reconsider in a move that clearly favored the adoption of a split. The "doughnut" split gained two wrinkles in the process. First, the commission opted to consider putting north Phoenix in the new area code as well. Second, the idea of changing to a three-way split where the East Valley and West Valley areas being spun out from 602 would receive their own area codes gained traction.

On December 18, 1998, the Corporation Commission approved the final plan to go into effect on September 1, 1999: a three-way split, under which the city of Phoenix minus Ahwatukee and areas north of Union Hills Road remained in 602; the East Valley, Town of Paradise Valley, and north Phoenix east of 22nd Street took area code 480; and the West Valley was placed into area code 623. (556 was also considered instead of 623.) All calls remained local across all three new area codes. The three-way split took place even though, in actuality, just three million phone numbers had been issued from the 7.5 million available in 602. Permissive dialing of the new area codes started on April 1.

The three Valley area codes form one of the largest local calling areas in the western United States. With the exception of the slivers of the Valley that are in the 520 and 928 area codes, no long-distance charges are applied from one portion of the Valley to another. Even with the split into three area codes, much of the Valley was still part of the Phoenix rate center.

Boundary elimination overlay
The three-way split, combined with the implementation of number pooling and other practices to encourage efficient use of telephone numbers, gave the Valley enough telephone numbers to absorb more than 20 years of growth. By October 2020, the North American Numbering Plan Administrator (NANPA) forecast that area code 480 would be exhausted by the first quarter of 2024 and 602 two years later in 2026. However, 623 was not forecast to exhaust until 2069; in 2021, it had 299 assigned central office codes as opposed to more than 700 in each of 480 and 602.

After NANPA initiated relief planning for 480, the state's telecommunications industry recommended to the Corporation Commission that the 1999 area code boundaries be eliminated, creating a three-code overlay complex. This would allow for pooled numbers to be used anywhere in the metropolitan area and for the assignment of new numbers (primarily from 623) throughout the single rate center. By this time, overlays had become the standard for relief. No area codes had been split anywhere in the United States since 2007, and a split could not be used to relieve 480 because of the 2021 implementation of 10-digit dialing in that area code. This would save the assignment of two area codes compared to individual all-service distributed overlays of 480 and 602 and last 26 years, as opposed to 35 for the introduction of new area codes. The Corporation Commission approved this plan on November 9, 2021. Implementation began in August 2022, after the national deadline to activate 988, with a six-month permissive 10-digit dialing period for the 602 and 623 areas to begin on February 11, 2023, ahead of the overlay becoming effective in August of that year; after that, recorded messages will pass on to callers dialing the old method.

Notes

References

External links 

602
602
Phoenix, Arizona
Telecommunications-related introductions in 1947